"Shake Sherry" (sometimes spelled on record as "Shake Sherrie") was a 1962 R&B song by Motown Records group The Contours, issued on its Gordy subsidiary label (Gordy 7012). It was the follow-up to the group's million-selling top-5 hit single "Do You Love Me", and was taken from their album of the same name.

Not as successful as its predecessor, "Shake Sherry" missed the Billboard Pop Top 40, peaking at number 43, and charted at number 21 on its R&B Chart. It was written by Motown Records' founder and first President Berry Gordy, who had written the group's previous hit, and had been quite successful as a songwriter and producer before founding Motown Records, having written hit singles for Jackie Wilson, Etta James, Marv Johnson, and others.

Unlike "Do You Love Me", which had been (allegedly) originally intended for The Temptations, Shake Sherry was written specifically for The Contours, one of several songs Gordy composed for the group.

This song's relative chart failure, compared to "Do You Love Me", meant that The Contours' run as a headline act in the Motortown Revue touring shows of the early 1960s was relatively short-lived: although their live performances made them a crowd favorite, history has branded them as "one hit wonders". Despite Motown's relative lack of promotion, The Contours charted several times for the label between 1962 and 1967.

Credits: The Contours
 Billy Gordon – lead
 Billy Hoggs – 2nd lead
 Sylvester Potts – tenor/baritone
 Hubert Johnson – bass
 Joe Billingslea – baritone
 Huey Davis – guitar

Other instruments: The Funk Brothers

References

External links
 Shake Sherry - song review from the "Motown Junkies" website

Recorded versions
 "Shake Sherry" by The Contours
 Harvey Russell and the Rogues

1962 singles
The Contours songs
Motown singles
Songs written by Berry Gordy
Song recordings produced by Berry Gordy
Gordy Records singles
1962 songs